A.O. Eikosimias  Football Club is a Greek football club, based in Vlachata, Cephalonia, Greece.

Honours

Domestic Titles and honours

 Kefalonia-Ithaca FCA champion: 3
 2010–11,2015-16, 2017-18
 Kefalonia-Ithaca FCA Cup Winners: 1
 2011-12

References

Football clubs in the Ionian Islands (region)
Cephalonia
Association football clubs established in 1993
1993 establishments in Greece
Gamma Ethniki clubs